Samuel Duran (born September 1, 1968, in Dangcagan, Bukidnon, Northern Mindanao, Philippines) is a Filipino former professional boxer.

Professional career
Samuel Duran made his professional debut on September 29, 1990, coming out triumphant for KO in the 5th round by a match against Thai Saming Kiatpech. After losing the next three matches, he began a series of consecutive victories, including a win against young Gerry Peñalosa (19-0-1). He was the first boxer to beat the former World Champion Gerry Penalosa. He is now an assistant trainer at Pacquiao's Gym in General Santos City.

Duran was a former Philippine Games and Amusement Board Featherweight Champion in 2002. He was a Philippine Boxing Federation Featherweight Champion in 2001. He was also an OPBF Featherweight Title holder in 1997 against Singnum Chuwatana and former PABA Bantamweight Champion and World Boxing Council International Bantamweight Champion.

Professional Record

References

1968 births
Living people
Featherweight boxers
Super-featherweight boxers
Bantamweight boxers
Sportspeople from Bukidnon
Filipino male boxers